This article lists the winners and nominees for the Billboard Music Award for Top New Artist. Zayn Malik is the only artist to have received the award twice, winning in 2013 as a member of One Direction and again in 2017 as a solo artist.

Winners and nominees
Winners are listed first and highlighted in bold.

1990s

2000s

2010s

2020s

References

Billboard awards